Vangelis Gotovos (born 13 August 1986) is a Greek professional footballer who plays as a defender for Gamma Ethniki club Panionios.

Club statistics

References

1986 births
Living people
Greek footballers
Association football defenders
Apollon Smyrnis F.C. players
Footballers from Thessaloniki